Anticrates phaedima is a moth of the Lacturidae family. It is known from Australia, including Queensland.

The wingspan is about 18 mm. Adults have whitish-yellow forewings with dark fuscous markings. The hindwings are red, but become paler towards the base.

References

Zygaenoidea